Miqan or Meyqan or Miyqan may refer to:
 Meyqan, Markazi
 Miqan, Semnan

See also
 Meyghan